Hunteria is a genus of plants in the family Apocynaceae first described as a genus in 1824. It is native to Africa and to South and Southeast Asia.

Species
 Hunteria ballayi Hua - Central African Republic, Republic of Congo, Cameroon, Gabon 
 Hunteria camerunensis K.Schum. ex Hallier f. - Republic of Congo, Cameroon, Gabon 
 Hunteria congolana Pichon - Republic of Congo, Zaïre, Kenya 
 Hunteria densiflora Pichon - Zaïre 
 Hunteria ghanensis J.B.Hall & Leeuwenb. - Ivory Coast, Ghana 
 Hunteria hexaloba (Pichon) Omino - Gabon 
 Hunteria macrosiphon Omino - Republic of Congo, Gabon 
 Hunteria myriantha Omino - Zaïre 
 Hunteria oxyantha Omino - Republic of Congo, Zaïre, Gabon 
 Hunteria simii (Stapf) H.Huber - Guinea, Ivory Coast, Liberia, Sierra Leone  
 Hunteria umbellata (K.Schum) Hallier f. - W + C Africa from Senegal to Zaïre 
 Hunteria zeylanica (Retz.) Gardner ex Thwaites - Somalia, Kenya, Tanzania, Mozambique, S China, India, Sri Lanka, Andaman & Nicobar Islands, Indochina, W Malaysia, Sumatra

References

 
Apocynaceae genera
Taxonomy articles created by Polbot